The white-eyelid mangabeys are African Old World monkeys belonging to the genus Cercocebus. They are characterized by their bare upper eyelids, which are lighter than their facial skin colouring, and the uniformly coloured hairs of the fur. The other two genera of mangabeys, Lophocebus and Rungwecebus, were once thought to be very closely related to Cercocebus, so much so that all the species were placed in one genus. However, it is now understood that Lophocebus and Rungwecebus species are more closely related to the baboons in genus Papio, while the Cercocebus species are more closely related to the mandrill.

Species
Genus Cercocebus 
Sooty mangabey, Cercocebus atys
Collared mangabey, Cercocebus torquatus
Agile mangabey, Cercocebus agilis
Golden-bellied mangabey, Cercocebus chrysogaster
Tana River mangabey, Cercocebus galeritus
Sanje mangabey, Cercocebus sanjei

References

External links

 Primate Info Net Cercocebus Factsheets
 Cercocebus in Animal Diversity Web

.
Primates of Africa
Taxa named by Étienne Geoffroy Saint-Hilaire